Galina Sergeyevna Lipatnikova (born 25 April 1984) is a Russian para-athlete, darts player and para-swimmer (regional class). In athletics, specializing in shot put, she is a one-time Paralympic champion and two-times runner-up in the Worlds and Europeans.

Career
Lipatnikova represented Russian Paralympic Committee athletes at the 2020 Summer Paralympics in the shot put F36 event and won a gold medal.

Awards
Lipatnikova is a Master of Sports in athletics and darts. She is also a Master of Sport of International Class.

References

1984 births
Living people
Sportspeople from Perm, Russia
Russian female shot putters
Paralympic athletes of Russia
Russian darts players
Paralympic swimmers of Russia
Medalists at the World Para Athletics European Championships
Medalists at the World Para Athletics Championships
Athletes (track and field) at the 2020 Summer Paralympics
Medalists at the 2020 Summer Paralympics
Paralympic medalists in athletics (track and field)
Paralympic gold medalists for the Russian Paralympic Committee athletes
20th-century Russian women
21st-century Russian women